Charles Jean Baptiste Perrin (6 July 1875 in Lyon – 26 March 1954 in Lyon) was a French rower who competed in the 1900 Summer Olympics.

He was part of the French boat Club Nautique de Lyon, which won the silver medal in the coxed four.

References

External links

1875 births
1954 deaths
French male rowers
Olympic rowers of France
Rowers at the 1900 Summer Olympics
Olympic silver medalists for France
Olympic medalists in rowing
Medalists at the 1900 Summer Olympics
20th-century French people
Sportspeople from Lyon